This list of mines in China is subsidiary to the list of mines article and lists working, defunct and future mines in the country and is organised by the primary mineral output. For practical purposes stone, marble and other quarries may be included in this list.

Antimony
Xikuangshan Mine

Boron
Wengquangou mine

Copper
Tonglushan mine

Gold
Jinfeng Gold Mine
Zaozigou Gold Mine
Sanshandao Gold Mine
Dexing Mine
Shaxi Copper Mine

Graphite
Liumao mine
Pingdu mine

Iron
Baizhiyan mine
Baoguosi mine
Benxi mine
Gongchangling mine
Jinling mine
Ma On Shan Iron Mine
Pangjiapu mine
Sanheming mine
Shuichang mine
Sijiaying mine
Tadong mine
Wuenduermiao mine
Yuanjiachun mine
Zhalanzhangzhi mine

Lead and Zinc
Caijiaying mine
Hongtoushan mine
Huanren mine
Huogeqi mine
Huoshaoyun
Qingchengzi mine
Tianbaoshan mine

Lithium
Jiajika mine

Fluorite
Hushan mine
Shizhuyuan mine
Sumoqagan mine
Taolin mine

Magnesium
Xiafangshen mine

Manganese
Wafangzi mine

Mercury
Lanmuchang

Molybdenum
Yangjiazhangzi mine
Yichun Luming mine

Niobium
Bayan Obo mine

Platinum
Kalatongke mine

Stone
Yangshan Quarry

Tantalum
Nanping mine
Tongliao mine
Yichun mine

Tungsten
Taoxikeng mine

Vanadium
Damiao mine

References

 
China